The National Rugby Sevens Championship is an annual rugby sevens competition hosted by the Australian Rugby Union. Tournaments are held for senior men's and women's teams, as well as for junior men's and women's teams with an under-18 age requirement. It is contested by teams from Australian states and territories, and National Indigenous representative sides, as well as teams from the Australian Armed Services, and Australian Universities.

The national women's tournament was launched in its present format in 2012, The inaugural national men's tournament was held in 2015.

Teams
The teams competing at the National Sevens Championships (as at 2015) are:

Men
 Australian Capital Territory
 Australian Universities
 National Indigenous
 New South Wales Blue
 New South Wales White
 Northern Territory
 Queensland Red
 Queensland White
 South Australia
 Tasmania
 Victoria
 Western Australia

Women
 Australian Capital Territory
 Australian Services
 Australian Universities
 National Indigenous
 New South Wales Blue
 New South Wales White
 Northern Territory
 Queensland Red
 Queensland White
 South Australia
 Victoria
 Western Australia

Championship winners

Men's 7s

Women's 7s

Men's Youth 7s

Women's Youth 7s

See also

 Australia national rugby sevens team
 Australia women's national rugby sevens team
 Oceania Sevens
 Oceania Women's Sevens Championship

References

External links
 Australian Sevens official ARU homepage

Rugby sevens competitions in Australia
2012 establishments in Australia